Romualdo is a given name. Notable people with the name include:

Agustín Romualdo Álvarez Rodríguez, O.F.M. Cap. (1923–2011), Spanish bishop of the Roman Catholic Church
Alejandro Romualdo (1926–2008), Peruvian poet of the 20th century
Pedro Romualdo (born 1935), Filipino politician
Peniche Everton Romualdo (born 1979), retired Brazilian professional footballer
Romualdo Arppi Filho (born 1939), retired football referee from Brazil
Romualdo Ghiglione (1891–1940), Italian gymnast who competed in the 1920 Summer Olympics
Romualdo Marenco (1841–1907), Italian composer primarily noted for ballet music
Romualdo Pacheco (1831–1899), American politician and diplomat
Romualdo Palacio González, Spanish general and governor of Puerto Rico in 1887

See also
Estadio Romualdo Bueso, football stadium in La Esperanza, Honduras
Rancho Huerta de Romualdo, 117-acre Mexican land grant in present-day San Luis Obispo County, California
Romualdo Del Bianco Foundation, Italian non-profit organization established in Florence, Italy, in 1998 by Paolo Del Bianco